By Surprise is the second album by Christian pop/rock artist Joy Williams. It features the songs "Every Moment", "Surrender", "I Wonder" and the title track.

Track listing

Personnel 
 Joy Williams – lead vocals, backing vocals (1, 3, 5-9)
 Jamie Kenney – keyboards (1, 2, 4, 6, 7, 9)
 Blair Masters – acoustic piano (3), Hammond B3 organ (7)
 Matt Rollings – acoustic piano (10)
 Rob Graves – acoustic guitar (1, 4, 7, 9), electric guitar (1, 4, 9), programming (2, 5, 6, 8), guitars (2, 3, 5, 6, 8), bass (2, 6, 8), bouzouki (3), percussion programming (4), loops (9)
 Jerry McPherson – electric guitar (2, 9), additional electric guitar (4)
 George Cocchini – additional electric guitar (4)
 Kenny Greenberg – additional electric guitar (5)
 Mike Brignardello – bass (1, 8)
 Joey Canaday – bass (3, 4, 7, 9)
 Steve Brewster – drums (1, 3, 4, 5, 7, 8, 9)
 Eric Darken – percussion (4)
 Carl Marsh – orchestral arrangements and conductor (3, 6)
 Gavyn Wright – concertmaster (3, 6)
 The London Session Orchestra – orchestra (3, 6)
 John Catchings – cello (10)
 Jerard Woods – backing vocals (1)
 Jovaun Woods – backing vocals (1)
 Lisa Cochran – backing vocals (2)
 Chris Eaton – backing vocals (2)
 Chris Rodriguez – backing vocals (4)
 Jason McArthur – backing vocals (5)

Production 
 Brown Bannister – producer
 Dean Diehl – executive producer
 Jason McArthur – A&R direction
 Steve Bishir – engineer, mixing, strings engineer (3, 6)
 Hank Nirider – assistant engineer
 Jonathan Allen – strings engineer (3, 6)
 Andrew Dudman – strings engineer (3, 6)
 Fred Paragano – digital editing
 Steve Hall – mastering
 Stephanie McBrayer – production coordination, creative director, stylist
 Traci Sterling Bishir – production coordination
 Michelle Bentrem – production coordination assistant
 Scott Hughes – art direction 
 Ron Roark – package design
 Tim Parker – additional cover design
 Matt Barnes – photography
 Traci Scrignoli – stylist 
 Lori Turk – make-up
 MANN Associates – management 

Studios
 Recorded at Paragon Studios and Sound Emporium (Nashville, Tennessee); The Sound Kitchen (Franklin, Tennessee).
 Strings recorded at Abbey Road Studios (London, UK).
 Mixed and Overdubbed at Oxford Sound (Nashville, Tennessee).
 Mastered at Future Disc (Hollywood, California).

Singles 
"Surrender"
 #9 AC
 #2 CHR
"Every Moment"
 #7 AC
 #1 CHR (1 week)
"I Wonder"
 #16 AC
"By Surprise"
 #7 CHR

Chart performance 
 #21 Heatseekers
 #31 Top Contemporary Christian

References 

2002 albums
Joy Williams (singer) albums